Goliath is a wooden roller coaster located at Six Flags Great America in Gurnee, Illinois. Manufactured by Rocky Mountain Construction (RMC) and designed by Alan Schilke, the roller coaster features RMC's Topper Track design and opened to the public on June 19, 2014. It still holds the record for the longest drop and fastest wooden roller coaster.

Goliath was constructed over a nine-month period on the site previously occupied by Iron Wolf, a steel roller coaster removed in 2011 and relocated to Six Flags America. Goliath's opening allowed Great America to claim the title of having the most wooden track in one park, a recognition that was later claimed by Kings Island. Following its record-breaking debut, the coaster was well-received by the media and enthusiasts, and it has consistently ranked in the top 25 among wooden coasters in the annual Golden Ticket Awards publication from Amusement Today.

History
On August 5, 2011, Six Flags Great America announced on its official Facebook page that the Iron Wolf would be closing permanently on September 5, 2011. The ride was subsequently removed and relocated to Six Flags America, where it reopened as Apocalypse: The Last Stand. For a brief period, Great America did not release any definitive plans for the site's replacement.

In early August 2013, Six Flags Great America released a teaser campaign entitled "Follow the Journey". The official announcement for Goliath came on August 29, 2013, where it was revealed the new wooden roller coaster would be manufactured by Rocky Mountain Construction (RMC) and open in 2014. As part of the announcement, the ride's statistics were released, along with a concept computer-animated video demonstrating the ride's layout. Situated on the site of the former Iron Wolf, Goliath utilized a majority of the station and line queue from the former ride, and the station was lengthened to accommodate the longer twelve-row trains.

Final design photos were released on Great America's Facebook page on February 21, 2014. These revealed a design change in Goliath's lift hill, which was modified to an all-steel structure as opposed to the original wood design. Another computer-animated video was also released on the park's official YouTube channel the same day.

Construction began in September 2013, employing a crew of approximately 35 workers by RMC. The team worked 11-hour days, six days a week through winter in occasional sub-zero temperatures finishing in May 2014, which amounted to approximately 40,000 man hours. Goliath was set to open on May 31, 2014, but the opening was delayed. The lift hill was topped off on May 16, with the first test run taking place two weeks later on May 31, the same day as the original opening. Lightning struck a small section of the ride's station on June 6, 2014, causing it to catch fire briefly before being extinguished. There were no reported injuries or major damage. After testing was completed, Goliath officially opened to the public on June 19, 2014.

Characteristics
Goliath is Rocky Mountain Construction's second ground-up wooden roller coaster following the opening of Silver Dollar City's Outlaw Run in early 2013. Although the ride is located in the County Fair section of Six Flags Great America, the name and theme of the ride was chosen purely on the basis of the ride's size and scale. Because Goliath was built in such a small space, the lift hill is abnormally steep at an angle of 45°. The entire track has been filled with grout to allow a quieter and smoother ride experience. The ride was designed by Alan Schilke.

Track

The  of track is made of six layers of laminated wood, with a steel square tube acting as the topmost layer of track. The steel square tube is known as Topper Track and is found on many roller coasters that Rocky Mountain Construction has renovated, as well as Outlaw Run. This track style is designed to reduce the maintenance typically required for a wooden roller coaster and to provide a smoother ride experience. Rocky Mountain Construction spent four years developing technology to allow them to twist beams of wood, that make up the lower layers of the track. This track configuration allows for more dynamic roller coaster elements to be performed on a wooden roller coaster.

Trains
Goliath operates with two trains manufactured by Rocky Mountain Construction. Each train is made up of six cars, with riders being arranged in two rows of two for a total of 24 riders per train. This configuration caters for approximately 800 riders per hour. The trains feature polyurethane wheels, allowing for a quieter ride. Riders are restrained through the use of an individual lap bar, shinbar, and seatbelt.

Ride experience

The ride begins with a left turn out of the station before ascending the  chain lift hill at a 45° angle. A dive loop is next, where riders are inverted before descending a half loop. The track then enters the second inversion, a zero gravity stall, where the train is suspended upside-down as it crests over a hill underneath the lift hill. This element is followed by a second overbanked turnaround, leading to the brake run and a short path back to the station. One cycle of the ride takes approximately 105 seconds to complete.

Records
Goliath claimed three Guinness World Records upon opening. The ride's  drop at 85° was the steepest and is still the longest in the world for wooden roller coasters. The steepness record is now held by Switchback at ZDT's Amusement Park, whose train at one point goes 87 degrees. After Goliath opened, Six Flags Great America had the most wooden roller coaster track of any amusement park in the world. However, this record was later surpassed by Kings Island with the opening of Mystic Timbers in 2017.

Reception
The opening of Goliath was widely reported across the world, with those experiencing the ride giving positive reviews. 
Jessica D'Onofrio of ABC7 Chicago stated Goliath was the smoothest roller coaster she had ever been on, describing it as "a great adrenaline rush".
Marcus Leshock of WGN-TV commended the uniqueness of the zero-g stall element, stating "it's something I've never really felt on a coaster before". He describes hanging upside down as a "really nice, fun, exhilarating feeling" without feeling disoriented.
Reviewing the ride for Shaw Media, Taylor Trimby of American Coaster Enthusiasts described Goliath as a wonderful ride, stating "You don't have time to prepare for anything. ... You're twisting and turning. ... It's great".
Anthony Murphy of Theme Park Insider praised the ride for being "one of the most intense roller coasters" he has ever ridden.

References

External links
 
 
 Iron Rattler at Rocky Mountain Construction
 

Roller coasters introduced in 2014
Roller coasters operated by Six Flags
Six Flags Great America
2014 establishments in Illinois